Living Daylights is an American jazz trio.

Living Daylights may also refer to:

 Living Daylights, an Australian pop duo including Boyd Wilson
 "Living Daylights", a song by DJ Fresh from the compilation Jungle Sound: The Bassline Strikes Back!
 "Living Daylights", a song by Kid Dynamite from Shorter, Faster, Louder
 "Living Daylights", a song by Two-Mix
 The Living Daylights, a 1987 James Bond film
 Living Daylight, a 1987 EP by Hunters & Collectors

See also
 The Living Daylights (disambiguation)